Timeline of the COVID-19 pandemic in Belarus may refer to:

 Timeline of the COVID-19 pandemic in Belarus (2020)
 Timeline of the COVID-19 pandemic in Belarus (2021)
 Timeline of the COVID-19 pandemic in Belarus (2022)

Belarus